The Book Beri'ah is a box set by John Zorn, released on August 17, 2018 by Tzadik Records. The box comprises the final ninety-two compositions that complete the final installment of Zorn's twenty-five year Masada project in limited edition box set of eleven compact discs. All About Jazz commended the compositions for having many levels of meaning and sonic listenability.

Track listing

Personnel
Adapted from The Book Beri'ah liner notes.

 Heung-Heung Chin (as Chippy) – design
 Scott Hull – mastering
 Kazunori Sugiyama – co-producer
 John Zorn – executive-producer

Release history

References

External links 
 The Book Beri'ah at Discogs (list of releases)
 Masada World: Book Three - The Book Beri'ah

2018 albums
Cleric (band) albums
Julian Lage albums
Craig Taborn albums
Secret Chiefs 3 albums
Tzadik Records albums